Province 4 (IV), also known as the Province of Sewanee, is one of nine ecclesiastical provinces making up the Episcopal Church in the United States of America. Being the largest of the provinces of the Episcopal Church, Province 4 is composed of twenty dioceses in nine states of the Southeastern United States.  Included in Province 4 are dioceses located in Alabama, Florida, Georgia, Kentucky, Mississippi, North Carolina, South Carolina, Tennessee, and part of Louisiana.  The Province has the largest number of clergy, baptized members, communicants, church school and day school pupils of any Province in the Episcopal Church. It is named for its seminary, the School of Theology of the University of the South, located in Sewanee, Tennessee. Angela Daniel of the Diocese of Upper South Carolina serves as President, and the Rt. Rev. Don Johnson of the Diocese of West Tennessee serves as Vice President.

Dioceses of Province IV

Diocese of Alabama
Diocese of Atlanta
Diocese of Central Florida
Diocese of the Central Gulf Coast
Diocese of East Carolina
Diocese of East Tennessee
Diocese of Florida
Diocese of Georgia
Diocese of Kentucky
Diocese of Lexington
Diocese of Louisiana
Diocese of Mississippi
Diocese of North Carolina
Episcopal Diocese of South Carolina
Diocese of Southeast Florida
Diocese of Southwest Florida
Diocese of Tennessee
Diocese of Upper South Carolina
Diocese of West Tennessee
Diocese of Western North Carolina

References

References and external links 
ECUSA Province Directory
Province IV website

Province 4
Religion in the Southern United States